James Olsen Jr. (June 2, 1921 – December 1, 2000) was an American professional basketball player. He played for the Chicago American Gears in the National Basketball League for nine games during the 1945–46 season and averaged 2.9 points per game.

References

1921 births
2000 deaths
American men's basketball players
Basketball players from Illinois
Basketball players from New York City
Centers (basketball)
Chicago American Gears players
Dartmouth Big Green men's basketball players
Forwards (basketball)
People from Glen Ellyn, Illinois
Sportspeople from Brooklyn
United States Navy personnel of World War II